Leucocybe is a recently defined mushroom genus in the family Tricholomataceae (in the broad sense). The species resemble Clitocybe and grow in forests or disturbed areas.

Etymology
The name Leucocybe is derived from ancient Greek leuco- referring to the color white, and -cybe, a reference to head or cap.

Species
The only two species in the genus are the following.
L. candicans (Pers.) Vizzini, P. Alvarado, G. Moreno & Consiglio (2015) - formerly Clitocybe candicans.
L. connata (Schumach.) Vizzini, P. Alvarado, G. Moreno & Consiglio (2015) - formerly Lyophyllum connatum or Clitocybe connata.
Leucocybe candicans is the type species.

See also
List of Agaricales genera

References

Agaricales genera
Tricholomataceae